Courtney Tremaine Upshaw (born December 13, 1989) is a former American football defensive end. He was drafted by the Baltimore Ravens in the second round of the 2012 NFL Draft. He played college football at Alabama.

High school career
Upshaw attended Eufaula High School, where he played for the Eufaula Tigers high school football team under head coach Dan Klages. In his junior season, Upshaw posted 96 tackles and three interceptions as he helped lead Eufaula to a 14–1 season record, including the Tigers first state championship finale appearances since 1981. They lost 10–7 to Athens. As a senior, Upshaw had 95 solo tackles, 65 assists, including 22 for loss and seven sacks to go with three fumble recoveries. He also had 20 receptions for 496 yards and three touchdowns as a tight end. He was the Alabama Class 5A Lineman of the Year by the Alabama Sports Writers Association and ASWA Class 5A All-State selection in 2007. Upshaw was ranked as the No. 4 defensive end in 2008 by ESPN.com.

College career
After playing in all 13 games of his freshman season, Upshaw saw his playing time increase in his second season at Alabama. He made one start and appeared in all 14 games for the Crimson Tide in 2009. Upshaw made the most of his first career start against Kentucky, as he tallied four solo tackles, one sack and returned a fumble 45 yards for a key against the Wildcats. In the 2010 BCS National Championship Game against the Texas Longhorns, Upshaw recovered a Garrett Gilbert fumble on an Eryk Anders quarterback sack with just 3:08 remaining in the game, that sealed the title for the Crimson Tide.

In his junior season, Upshaw started 11 games for the Crimson Tide. He accounted for 52 total tackles, 14.5 tackles for loss, seven sacks, and four forced fumbles. In the 2011 Capital One Bowl against Michigan State, Upshaw led the defense for the Crimson Tide, who won 49–7, with a pair of sacks, five tackles, including three for a loss as well as forcing a fumble, and was voted the game's MVP for his effort.

In his senior season, Upshaw started all 13 games for the Crimson Tide. He accounted for 51 total tackles, 17 tackles for loss, 9.5 sacks, and two forced fumbles. For his on-field performance, Upshaw was named first-team All-America by the Football Writers Association of America and The Sporting News. He was also recognized as second-team All-America by the Walter Camp Football Foundation and the Associated Press. In the 2012 BCS National Championship Game, Upshaw was named the defensive MVP with his seven tackle performance, which included one sack and one tackle for a loss.

College statistics

Professional career

2012 NFL Draft
Upshaw was taken by the Baltimore Ravens with the third pick of the second round (35th overall) in the 2012 NFL Draft.

Baltimore Ravens
On May 10, 2012, he signed a four-year, $5,296,698 contract (with $3,587,000 guaranteed) with the Ravens. During his rookie year in 2012, Upshaw played 16 games with 55 tackles, 1.5 sacks, two passes defended, one forced fumble, and two fumble recoveries. In Super Bowl XLVII, Upshaw recorded his first forced fumble against San Francisco 49ers running back LaMichael James, which the Ravens recovered and scored on the ensuing possession. The Ravens won the Super Bowl by a score of 34–31, giving Upshaw his first championship title.

In 2013, Upshaw played 16 games with 31 tackles, 1.5 sacks, and two passes defended. In 2014, he played 16 games with 46 tackles and one pass defended. In 2015, he played 16 games with 51 tackles, two sacks, two passes defended, two forced fumbles, and two fumble recoveries. After the 2015 season, he became a free agent.

Atlanta Falcons
On March 25, 2016, Upshaw signed a one-year contract with Atlanta Falcons worth $1.25 million. In 13 games of 2016, Upshaw finished the year with 24 tackles, a sack, and a forced fumble. The Falcons finished the season with an 11-5 record, and eventually made it to Super Bowl LI, where they would lose in overtime to the New England Patriots by a score of 34–28. In the game, Upshaw had one sack and one total tackle.

On March 9, 2017, the Falcons re-signed Upshaw.

New York Jets
On June 14, 2018, Upshaw signed with the New York Jets. On July 28, 2018, Upshaw was released by the Jets.

References

External links
 
 Alabama Crimson Tide bio
 Baltimore Ravens bio
 Atlanta Falcons bio
 New York Jets bio

1989 births
Living people
People from Eufaula, Alabama
Players of American football from Alabama
American football linebackers
American football defensive ends
Alabama Crimson Tide football players
All-American college football players
Under Armour All-American football players
Baltimore Ravens players
Atlanta Falcons players
New York Jets players